James Haffey (February 8, 1857 – November 11, 1910) was an American politician in the state of Washington. He served in the Washington House of Representatives from 1895 to 1897.

References

1857 births
1910 deaths
Republican Party members of the Washington House of Representatives
People from Carbon County, Pennsylvania
19th-century American politicians
People from Skamania County, Washington